Kashif is a given name and surname.

Kashif may also refer to:
 Kashif (musician) (1956–2016), American multi-instrumentalist
 Kashif (1983 album)
 Kashif (1989 album)
 Kashif & Shanghai Knockout Tournament, a Guyanese football tournament
 Kashif, Syria, a village